Super Hungama is an Indian pay television channel owned by The Walt Disney Company India. a wholly owned by The Walt Disney Company. It primarily focuses on children's animated series and is a direct sister channel to Hungama TV.

The channel was started as the Indian version of Toon Disney in December 2004 and also carried the Jetix block in India. Both brands were replaced by Disney XD in 2009. The channel became known as Marvel HQ in January 2019 and Super Hungama on 1 March 2022.

History
In December 2004, The Walt Disney Company launched two television channels in India—Disney Channel and Toon Disney—as a part of an effort to expand their presence in the South Asian market. Both channels broadcast in English, Hindi, Tamil, and Telugu. Toon Disney started with English, Tamil and Telugu and gained a Hindi-language audio track on 1 September 2005. Toon Disney carried the Jetix programming block in India.

Disney XD replaced Toon Disney and Jetix in November 2009. The channel ceased to be available in Bangladesh in February 2013 as being an unapproved service; the move came as the government banned broadcasts of the Hindi-dubbed cartoon series Doraemon over fears that children would learn Hindi and not Bengali.

Marvel HQ replaced the Indian version of Disney XD on 20 January 2019. Disney India noted that Marvel was a "pop-culture phenomenon" worthy of a dedicated Marvel channel. The channel targeted children aged 6–17 with action-adventure animation and live action programming.

At launch, the main Marvel programming would consist of four animated shows and 40 percent of the total schedule, with additional Marvel animated series added or seasons started in March 2019. Over time, non-Marvel animated series were added, including Pokémon and Beyblade.

On 18 October 2021, Disney announced that Marvel HQ would be rebranded as Super Hungama on 1 December. On 30 November, one day before the intended launch, it was delayed due to issues involving the implementation of the Telecom Regulatory Authority of India's New Tariff Order 2.0. The rebrand went ahead on 1 March 2022.

Programming

See also
 Disney XD (Indian TV channel)
 Disney Junior India
 List of Disney Channel (Indian TV channel) series
 List of programmes broadcast by Jetix India
 List of programmes broadcast by Fox Kids India
 List of programmes broadcast by Disney Channel (India)
 List of Indian animated television series
 List of programmes broadcast by Hungama TV

References

Television stations in Mumbai
Children's television channels in India
Indian animation
English-language television stations in India
Television channels and stations established in 2004
2004 establishments in India
Disney India Media Networks
Marvel Entertainment
Disney Star